Kokilapriya (The one dear to the koel) is a ragam in Carnatic music (musical scale of South Indian classical music). It is the 11th Melakarta rāgam in the 72 melakarta rāgam system of Carnatic music. The 11th rāgam in Muthuswami Dikshitar school of Carnatic music is called Kokilāravam.

Structure and Lakshana

It is the 5th rāgam in the 2nd chakra Netra. The mnemonic name is Netra-Ma. The mnemonic phrase is sa ra gi ma pa dha na. Its  structure (ascending and descending scale) is as follows (see swaras in Carnatic music for details on below notation and terms):
: 
: 
(this scale uses the notes shuddha rishabham, sadharana gandharam, shuddha madhyamam, chathusruthi dhaivatham, kakali nishadham)

As it is a melakarta rāgam, by definition it is a sampoorna rāgam (has all seven notes in ascending and descending scale). It is the shuddha madhyamam equivalent of Suvarnangi, which is the 47th melakarta.

Asampurna Melakarta 
Kokilāravam is the 11th Melakarta in the original list compiled by Venkatamakhin. The notes used in the scale are the same, but the scales are vakra (zig-zag in phrases of the scale). It is an shadava-sampurna raga (6 notes in ascending scale, while full 7 are used in descending scale).
: 
:

Janya rāgams 
Kokilapriya has a few minor janya rāgams (derived scales) associated with it. See List of janya rāgams for full list of rāgams associated with this scale.

Compositions 
Here are a few common compositions sung in concerts, set to Kokilapriya.

Dasarathe Dayasaradhe by Thyagaraja
Vadamela Radha Manohara by Dr. M. Balamuralikrishna
Neeke abhimanamu by Mysore Vasudevachar
kOdanDarAmam anisham in Kokilāravam by Muthuswami Dikshitar

Related rāgams 
This section covers the theoretical and scientific aspect of this rāgam.

Kokilapriya's notes when shifted using Graha bhedam, yields Rishabhapriya melakarta rāgam. Graha bhedam is the step taken in keeping the relative note frequencies same, while shifting the shadjam to the next note in the rāgam. For further details and an illustration refer Graha bhedam on Kokilapriya.

Notes

References

Melakarta ragas